Stanley Chave Kerr Bate (born 1906) is a British architect, the son of Commander Francis William Bate RNR, Surveyor Marine Dept, Board of Trade, and his wife Helen Maria Talbot Bate. Kerr Bate began his career with the inheritance of the architectural practice of Frederick Walters.

In 1953, a south aisle designed by Kerr Bate was added to the Church of St Anselm and St Cecilia, and the facade rebuilt. Walters originally had designed the church, which was built in 1909. Kerr Bate also was the architect for the Catholic church of St. Joan of Arc, Highbury in London, built in 1960, and further designed Holy Trinity, Otford, built from 1980.

References

1906 births
British architects
Year of death missing